Felipe de Figueiredo Ferreira commonly known as Felipe Ferreira (born 25 April 1994) is a Brazilian football midfielder who plays for Ferroviária.

Career
Born in national capital Brasilia, Felipe Ferreira played in youth ranks of Grêmio, having debuted for their first team in the 2014 Campeonato Gaúcho. In 2015 he went on loan to fellow league rivals Atlético Goianiense. Upon returning to Grêmio, he played mostly for their reserves team. The year of 2016 started with a loan agreement with lower-league side Atlético Tubarão, however, it was soon interrompted as Grêmio accepted an offer for a permanent move to FK Javor Ivanjica. Felipe Ferreira arrived to Serbia and signed a 3-year contract on February 1, 2016. However, he failed to adapt and returned to Brasil without having made an official debut with Javor. After spending some time searching for a club, he signed with Ferroviária. They sent him on loan to Matonense where he played in the Campeonato Paulista A3. He started the following season with a short spell with Taubaté in the Campeonato Paulista A2, before joining Ferroviária main team for good. In April 2019 he agreed to play on loan with CRB in 2019 Campeonato Brasileiro Série B where his great performances granted him a loan move to Brazilian giants CR Vasco da Gama which got him on loan in September 2019. He made a debut with Vasco in the Brazilian highest level, 2019 Campeonato Brasileiro Série A.

Honours
Botafogo
 Campeonato Brasileiro Série B: 2021

Ferroviária
Copa Paulista: 2017

References

1994 births
Living people
Footballers from Brasília
Brazilian footballers
Brazilian expatriate footballers
Association football midfielders
Grêmio Foot-Ball Porto Alegrense players
Atlético Clube Goianiense players
Clube Atlético Tubarão players
FK Javor Ivanjica players
Expatriate footballers in Serbia
Associação Ferroviária de Esportes players
Sociedade Esportiva Matonense players
Esporte Clube Taubaté players
Clube de Regatas Brasil players
CR Vasco da Gama players
Botafogo de Futebol e Regatas players
Campeonato Brasileiro Série A players
Campeonato Brasileiro Série B players